The 19th Annual Australian Recording Industry Association Music Awards (generally known as ARIA Music Awards or simply The ARIAS) were held on 23 October 2005 at the Sydney SuperDome at the Sydney Olympic Park complex, thus continuing the previous year's innovation of televising the awards on Sunday evening. A varied cast of presenters included Merrick and Rosso (who opened the televised show), stand-up comic Dave Hughes, Gretel Killeen and David Hasselhoff.

On 14 July 2005 ARIA sought to create a separate standalone 'ARIA Icons: Hall of Fame' event as only one or two acts could be inducted under the old format due to time restrictions. Six acts were inducted into the Hall of Fame in July with an additional act inducted at the following ARIA Music Awards in October.

Awards
Winners are highlighted in bold, other final nominees are in plain.

ARIA Awards
Album of the Year
Missy Higgins – The Sound of White
Ben Lee – Awake Is the New Sleep
Evermore – Dreams
Keith Urban – Be Here
Sarah Blasko – The Overture & the Underscore
Single of the Year
Ben Lee – "Catch My Disease"
Evermore – "For One Day"
Missy Higgins – "The Special Two"
Thirsty Merc – "Someday, Someday"
Wolfmother – "Woman"
Best Male Artist
Ben Lee – Awake Is the New Sleep
John Butler – "Something's Gotta Give"
Keith Urban – Be Here
Lior – Autumn Flow
Paul Kelly – Foggy Highway
Best Female Artist
Missy Higgins – The Sound of White
Kylie Minogue – "I Believe in You"
Mia Dyson – Parking Lots
Natalie Imbruglia – Counting Down the Days
Sarah Blasko – The Overture & the Underscore
Best Group
Eskimo Joe – "Older Than You"
Evermore – Dreams
Grinspoon – Thrills, Kills & Sunday Pills
Powderfinger – These Days
Thirsty Merc – "Someday, Someday"
Highest Selling Album
Missy Higgins – The Sound of White
Anthony Callea – Anthony Callea
Casey Donovan – For You
Delta Goodrem – Mistaken Identity
Guy Sebastian – Beautiful Life
Highest Selling Single
Anthony Callea – "The Prayer"
Anthony Callea – "Rain" / "Bridge over Troubled Water"
Casey Donovan – "Listen with Your Heart"
Delta Goodrem & Brian McFadden – "Almost Here"
Missy Higgins – "The Special Two"
Breakthrough Artist – Album
Missy Higgins – The Sound of White
Evermore – DreamsLior – Autumn FlowLittle Birdy – BigBigLoveSarah Blasko – The Overture & the UnderscoreBreakthrough Artist – Single
End of Fashion – "O Yeah"
Joel Turner and the Modern Day Poets – "These Kids"
Kisschasy – "Do-Do's & Whoa-Oh's"
The Veronicas – "4ever"
Wolfmother – "Woman"
Best Adult Contemporary Album
The Go-Betweens – Oceans ApartArchitecture in Helsinki – In Case We Die
John Farnham & Tom Jones – Together in Concert
Renée Geyer – Tonight
The Church – El Momento Descuidado
Best Blues & Roots AlbumMia Dyson – Parking LotsAsh Grunwald – Live at the Corner
The Beautiful Girls – We're Already Gone
Jeff Lang – You Have to Dig Deep to Bury Daddy
The Waifs – A Brief History...
Best Children's AlbumThe Wiggles – Live: Hot PotatoesBananas in Pyjamas – Sing and Be Happy
Hi-5 – Making Music
Sean O'Boyle – Hush Little Baby
The Hooley Dooleys – Super Dooper
Best Comedy ReleaseTripod – Middleborough RdJimeoin – Third Drawer Down
Rodney Rude – Twice As Rude
Shane Dundas & Dave Collins – The Umbilical Brothers
Various Artists – Classic Skithouse
Best Country AlbumKeith Urban – Be HereAdam Harvey – Can't Settle For Less
Audrey Auld-Mezera – Texas
Paul Kelly & the Stormwater Boys – Foggy Highway
Sara Storer – Firefly
Best Dance ReleaseInfusion – Six Feet Above YesterdayBodyrockers – "I Like the Way"
Deepface – "Been Good"
Dirty South – "Sleazy"
Rogue Traders – "Voodoo Child"
Best Independent ReleaseBen Lee – Awake Is the New SleepArchitecture in Helsinki – In Case We Die
Joel Turner and the Modern Day Poets – Joel Turner and the Modern Day Poets
Lior – Autumn Flow
The Waifs – A Brief History...
Best Music DVDJet – 'Right! Right! Right!Hoodoo Gurus – Tunnel Vision
Powderfinger – These Days: Live in Concert
The Dissociatives – Sydney Circa 2004/08
Various Artists – WaveAid
Best Pop ReleaseMissy Higgins – The Sound of WhiteBen Lee – Awake Is the New Sleep
Kylie Minogue – I Believe in You
Sarah Blasko – The Overture & the Underscore
Thirsty Merc – "Someday, Someday"
Best Rock AlbumGrinspoon – Thrills, Kills & Sunday PillsEvermore – Dreams
Little Birdy – BigBigLove
Shihad – Love Is the New Hate
The Cat Empire – Two Shoes
Best Urban ReleaseDaniel Merriweather – "She's Got Me"
Butterfingers – "Figjam"
Jade MacRae – "So Hot Right Now"
Joel Turner and the Modern Day Poets – Joel Turner and the Modern Day Poets
Weapon X and Ken Hell – "Otherman"

Artisan Awards
Best Cover ArtBen Lee, Lara Meyerratken, Dan Estabrook – Ben Lee – Awake Is the New SleepCameron Bird – Architecture in Helsinki – In Case We Die
Cathie Glassby – Missy Higgins – The Sound of White
David Homer & Aaron Hayward, Debaser – Kisschasy – United Paper People
Reg Mombassa – Paul Kelly & the Stormwater Boys – Foggy Highway
Best VideoBen Quinn – End of Fashion – "O Yeah"
Adrian Van De Velde – Thirsty Merc – "In the Summertime"
Ben Joss, Tribal – John Butler Trio – "Something's Gotta Give"
Ben Quinn – The Cat Empire – "The Car Song"
Sam Bennetts, Mad Angel – Rogue Traders – "Voodoo Child"
Engineer of the YearMatt Lovell – The Mess Hall – Notes from a CeilingJames Ash – Rogue Traders – Voodoo Child
Paul McKercher – Little Birdy – BigBigLove
Paul McKercher & Eskimo Joe – Eskimo Joe – "Older Than You"
David Nicholas – Drag – The Way Out
Producer of the YearDavid Nicholas – Drag – The Way Out
Chris Joannou & The Mess Hall – The Mess Hall – Notes from a Ceiling
Harry Vanda & Glenn Goldsmith – The Wrights – "Evie Parts 1, 2 & 3"
Paul McKercher – Little Birdy – BigBigLove
Paul McKercher & Eskimo Joe – Eskimo Joe – "Older Than You"

Fine Arts Awards
Best Classical AlbumAustralian Brandenburg Orchestra – SanctuaryElena Kats-Chernin – Wild Swans
Michael Kieran Harvey – Rabid Bay
Sara Macliver & Sally-Anne Russell – Baroque Duets
Slava Grigoryan – Afterimage
Best Jazz AlbumPaul Grabowsky & Katie Noonan – Before Time Could Change UsAndrea Keller – Quartet Angels and Rascals
Aronas – Culture Tunnels
Oehlers & Keevers – Grace
The Necks – Mosquito / See Through
Best Soundtrack / Cast / Show RecordingSevered Heads – The Illustrated Family DoctorArt Phillips – Outback House
Ben Mingay & Deone Zanotto – Dirty Dancing – The Classic Story on Stage
Roger Mason – The Extra
Various Artists – Deck Dogz
Best World Music AlbumMonsieur Camembert – Monsieur CamembertBobby McLeod – Dumaradje
Cosmo Cosmolino – Nektar
Le Tuan Hung and others – On the Wings of a Butterfly
Southern Gospel Choir – Great Day
Various Artists – This Is the Place for a Song

Hall of Fame inductees
On 14 July 2005, ARIA sought to create a separate standalone 'ARIA Icons: Hall of Fame' event as only one or two acts could be inducted under the old format due to time restrictions. Since 2005 VH1 obtained the rights to broadcast the ceremony live on Foxtel, Austar and Optus networks; and each year five or six acts were inducted into the Hall of Fame with an additional act inducted at the following ARIA Music Awards. The following were inducted into the ARIA Hall of Fame in July:Smoky Dawson inducted by Jack ThompsonThe Easybeats inducted by Billy ThorpeRenée Geyer inducted by Michael GudinskiHunters & Collectors inducted by Peter GarrettNormie Rowe inducted by Ian MeldrumSplit Enz inducted by John Clarke
Inducted at the October ceremony:Jimmy Barnes inducted by Bernard Fanning

Performers
The following artists performed during the 2005 ARIA Awards:
Rogue Traders – "Voodoo Child"
Thirsty Merc – "Someday, Someday"
Evermore – "It's Too Late"
Anthony Callea – "The Prayer"
Missy Higgins – "The Sound of White"
Grinspoon – "Hard Act to Follow"
Neil Finn – "Better Be Home Soon" (Tribute to the late Paul Hester, who was in Split Enz and Crowded House with Finn)
Ben Lee – "Catch My Disease"
Jimmy Barnes – "Working Class Man"

Channel V Oz Artist of the Year
Channel V Oz Artist of the YearAnthony Callea'''
Kisschasy
Missy Higgins
The Veronicas

Judging academy

In 2005, the generalist categories were determined by the "voting academy", which consisted of about 1000 representatives from across the music industry. Members of the academy are kept secret. Membership is by invitation only. An individual record company may have up to eight members on the academy. The only artists eligible to vote are winners and nominees from the previous year's awards. (See pie chart'' at right.)

See also
Music of Australia
Rock music in Australia

References

ARIA Music Awards
2005 in Australian music
2005 music awards